Reinaldo José da Silva or simply Reinaldo (born 24 February 1980), in Patos de Minas, is a Brazilian striker. He currently plays as a forward for Mamoré.

Career
He had previously played for Atlético Mineiro and Vasco da Gama in his native country, he has also played for Helsingborgs IF in Sweden. He became the Campeonato Brasileiro Série B 2005's top scorer with 16 goals.

Reinaldo joined the Mexican side Club Universidad Nacional, a Mexico City team commonly known as the Pumas for the 2006 season from Grêmio. He came with the idea of becoming a consistent goal scorer in Mexico.

Honours

Individual
 Brazilian 2nd Division League Top Scorer: 2005

External links
 
 agesporte.com.br

1980 births
Living people
Brazilian footballers
Brazilian expatriate footballers
Campeonato Brasileiro Série B players
Allsvenskan players
Liga MX players
Clube Atlético Mineiro players
Helsingborgs IF players
CR Vasco da Gama players
Santa Cruz Futebol Clube players
Grêmio Foot-Ball Porto Alegrense players
Club Universidad Nacional footballers
Ceará Sporting Club players
Paysandu Sport Club players
Clube do Remo players
Ipatinga Futebol Clube players
Expatriate footballers in Sweden
Expatriate footballers in Mexico
Association football forwards